Frederick William Thomas Craske was Bishop of Gibraltar from 1953 to 1959.

Biography 
Frederick Craske was born on 11, May, 1901 and educated at King's College London before embarking on an ecclesiastical career with curacies at St Chrysostum, Victoria Park, Manchester and All Hallows Lombard Street in the City of London. After this he held  incumbencies at St John the Evangelist Read-in-Whalley and St John the Evangelist, Blackburn. From 1939 to 1953 he was education secretary to the Missionary Council of the Church Assembly and then (before his elevation to the episcopate) founded the Church of England Youth Council. A Sub-Prelate of the Order of St John of Jerusalem, he died on 10 March 1971.

Notes

1901 births
Alumni of King's College London
Associates of King's College London
20th-century Anglican bishops of Gibraltar
1971 deaths
Sub-Prelates of the Venerable Order of Saint John